Patricia Aguilar García (born 20 August 1952) is a Mexican politician from the Institutional Revolutionary Party. From 2000 to 2003 she served as Deputy of the LVIII Legislature of the Mexican Congress representing Chiapas.

References

1952 births
Living people
Politicians from Mexico City
Women members of the Chamber of Deputies (Mexico)
Deputies of the LVIII Legislature of Mexico
Institutional Revolutionary Party politicians
21st-century Mexican politicians
21st-century Mexican women politicians
Members of the Congress of Chiapas
National Autonomous University of Mexico alumni
20th-century Mexican politicians
20th-century Mexican women politicians
Members of the Chamber of Deputies (Mexico) for Chiapas